3-Methylthiophene is an organosulfur compound with the formula CH3C4H3S.  It is a colorless, flammable liquid.  It can be produced by sulfidation of 2-methylsuccinate. Like its isomer 2-methylthiophene, its commercial synthesis involvess vapor-phase dehydrogenation of suitable precursors.  3-Methylthiophene is a precursor to the drug thenyldiamine and the pesticide morantel.

References

Thiophenes